Kassa (English: Cash Register) is a Dutch consumer television program produced by BNNVARA (formerly just VARA), which was created by Felix Meurders. Meurders hosted the program from 1989 to 2011. From 2011 to 2019 it was hosted by Brecht van Hulten. Since 2020 it is hosted by Amber Kortzorg. The program focuses on consumer affairs, reviewing and testing products, and also doing investigative reporting on issues with products or services. VARA also produces spinoffs of Kassa, such as a daily internet program called "Consumentennieuws" (Consumer News), Kassa 3 - aimed more towards youth audiences, and Radio Kassa, a consumer news talk program.

In 2004, the VARA received the Dutch "Spin-Award" prize from the general public in the Netherlands. On 29 September 2007, Kassa won an award in the Prix Italia for the show's interactive web content.

Xbox 360 investigations
In February 2007, Kassa brought significant media attention when it aired an investigative report on disc scratching problems with Microsoft's Xbox 360 video game console.

References

External links
 Kassa 
 Spin Awards 
 Prix Italia 

1989 Dutch television series debuts
1980s Dutch television series
1990s Dutch television series
2000s Dutch television series
2010s Dutch television series
Dutch television news shows
Investigative journalism
NPO 1 original programming